Julián Álvarez (born 31 January 2000) is an Argentine professional footballer who plays as a forward for Premier League club Manchester City and the Argentina national team. Nicknamed  ("The Spider"), he is known for his aggressive pressing, dynamic scoring ability, and link-up play.

Club career

River Plate

Álvarez joined River Plate from Atlético Calchín in 2016, notably participating in the Generation Adidas Cup with the club's youth teams. Prior to signing for River, Álvarez had trials with Boca Juniors and Real Madrid; scoring twice in five games for the latter in a youth tournament. He was unable to join Real due to age restrictions. Álvarez was moved into River Plate's senior squad under manager Marcelo Gallardo during the 2018–19 season, with his professional debut arriving on 27 October 2018 during a Primera División fixture with Aldosivi; he was subbed on for Rodrigo Mora with 26 minutes remaining of a 1–0 victory.

Álvarez appeared late on during the second leg of the 2018 Copa Libertadores finals, with River beating rivals Boca Juniors. Álvarez scored the first goal of his senior career on 17 March 2019, netting in a 3–0 league win over Independiente. During the succeeding December, he scored in the 2019 Copa Argentina Final against Central Córdoba as River won 3–0 to secure the trophy In 2020, Álvarez netted five goals in six Copa Libertadores group stage encounters.

On 25 May 2022, Álvarez scored six goals for River Plate in an 8–1 win over Alianza Lima in the Copa Libertadores.

Manchester City
On 31 January 2022, his 22nd birthday, it was confirmed that Álvarez had signed for Premier League champions Manchester City on a five-and-a-half-year contract, but with the player remaining at River Plate on loan until July. He scored on his competitive debut on 30 July, where City lost 1–3 to rivals Liverpool in the Community Shield. On 7 August, Álvarez made his Premier League debut after coming on as a substitute for Erling Haaland in a 2–0 away win over West Ham United. On 31 August, Álvarez scored his first two Premier League goals in a 6–0 win against Nottingham Forest at the Etihad Stadium.

International career
In 2018, Álvarez was selected by the Argentina U-20s to train against the senior team at the 2018 FIFA World Cup. In December, Álvarez was picked for the 2019 South American U-20 Championship. He received a call-up from Fernando Batista for the 2019 FIFA U-20 World Cup in May 2019. Four matches and one goal, versus South Africa, arrived for him in Poland. Batista subsequently called Álvarez up for the U-23s in the succeeding September, which preceded his selection for the 2020 CONMEBOL Pre-Olympic Tournament; which Argentina won, with Álvarez scoring once (versus Venezuela) in seven matches.

Álvarez made his debut for the Argentina senior team on 3 June 2021, in a World Cup qualifier against Chile. He substituted Ángel Di María in the 62nd minute. On 29 March 2022, he scored his first international goal in a 1–1 draw against Ecuador.

He was included in Argentina's World Cup Winning 26-man squad for the 2022 FIFA World Cup in Qatar. On 30 November, he scored his first World Cup goal in a 2–0 win in the last group stage match against Poland.  Álvarez followed with a second World Cup goal on 3 December, when he scored in Argentina's 2–1 win against Australia. He continued his scoring streak by adding two more goals in Argentina's 3–0 win against Croatia in the semi-finals, becoming the youngest player since Pelé in 1958 to score two goals in a World Cup semi-final at 22 years, 316 days old. On 18 December, he was involved in Argentina's second goal as his team defeated France 4–2 on penalties after the match ended 3–3 in extra-time of the final to win the World Cup.

Career statistics

Club

International

Scores and results list Argentina's goal tally first, score column indicates score after each Álvarez goal.

Honours
River Plate
Argentine Primera División: 2021
Copa Argentina: 2018–19
Supercopa Argentina: 2019
Trofeo de Campeones: 2021
Copa Libertadores: 2018
Recopa Sudamericana: 2019

Argentina U23
CONMEBOL Pre-Olympic Tournament: 2020

Argentina
FIFA World Cup: 2022
Copa América: 2021
CONMEBOL–UEFA Cup of Champions: 2022

Individual
South American Youth Championship Team of the Tournament: 2019
Argentine Primera División top scorer: 2021
South American Footballer of the Year: 2021
South American Team of the Year: 2021
 Etihad Player of the Month for November : 2022

References

External links

2000 births
Living people
Sportspeople from Córdoba Province, Argentina
Argentine footballers
Association football forwards
Club Atlético River Plate footballers
Manchester City F.C. players
Argentine Primera División players
Premier League players
Argentina youth international footballers
Argentina under-20 international footballers
Argentina international footballers
2021 Copa América players
2022 FIFA World Cup players
Copa América-winning players
Copa Libertadores-winning players
FIFA World Cup-winning players
South American Footballer of the Year winners